Chipledhunga (Nepali: चिप्लेढुड़गा) is the financial hub and busiest place of Pokhara. It is one of the most frequented marketplace in the whole of Pokhara, from clothing, Banking, jewellery to electronics. It is one of the oldest and busiest marketplaces in the city. Chipledhunga has been one of the city's main marketplaces since ancient times.

Origin of the name 
Chipledhunga means "Slippery Stone" in Nepalese Language. The name is derived from the large slippery stone situated at this place.

Boundaries of Chipledhunga 

 East: Mahendrapul
 West: Siddhartha Chowk
 North: Gairapatan
 South: New Road

Gallery

References 

Neighbourhoods in Pokhara